Countrified is the first full-length album of the German metal band Farmer Boys. All of the album's songs make reference to farm life or farm animals.  It also has a cover track of Depeche Mode's "Never Let Me Down Again". The album is the band's heaviest album ever recorded and it strongly features elements from thrash metal, groove metal and gothic metal. Music videos for "Farm Sweet Farm" and "Never Let Me Down Again" were directed by Nick Lyon. Countrified sold over 10,000 copies.

Tracks 

Farm Sweet Farm – 5:23
Chew the Cud – 3:56
Relieve the Tension 4:26
When a Chicken Cries for Love – 3:31
In a Distance to God – 5:18
Two, Three, Farm – 4:55
From Pig to Men – 4:50
Call Me a Hog – 5:29
Never Let Me Down Again (Depeche Mode cover) – 3:46, with Anneke van Giersbergen
Countrified – 5:45

1996 albums
Farmer Boys (band) albums